William Irving Latimer (August 5, 1836April 19, 1922) was a Michigan politician.

Early life
Latimer was born on August 5, 1836, in Dutchess County, New York. Latimer attended school in Poughkeepsie, New York.

Career
Latimer moved to Newaygo, Michigan to work for the Newaygo Lumber Company, where he worked from 1859 to 1865. Latimer served as the Mecosta County treasurer for three terms. Latimer served as the mayor of Big Rapids, Michigan in 1870. In 1876, he was a member of Michigan Republican State Central Committee. Latimer served as Michigan Auditor General from 1879 to 1982. On November 6, 1894, Latimer was elected as a member of the Michigan House of Representatives, where he represented Mecosta County and served from January 2, 1895, to 1896. On November 3, 1896, Latimer was elected as a member of the Michigan Senate, where he represented the 25th district served from January 6, 1897, to 1900.

Personal life
Latimer married Olivia Spencer Cobb on April 8, 1863, in Kent County, Michigan. Together they had one daughter. Latimer was Episcopalian. Latimer was a Freemason.

Death
Latimer died on April 19, 1922, in Portland Oregon.

References

1836 births
1922 deaths
American Freemasons
County treasurers in Michigan
People from Dutchess County, New York
Episcopalians from Michigan
Republican Party members of the Michigan House of Representatives
Republican Party Michigan state senators
Michigan Auditors General
Mayors of places in Michigan
19th-century American Episcopalians
20th-century American Episcopalians
19th-century American politicians
20th-century American politicians